Taşçı is a Turkish word meaning "stonemason." It may refer to:

People
 Serdar Tasci, German footballer
 Tuğba Taşçı, Turkish female basketball player
 Vecihe Taşçı (1905–2002), Turkish female rower and tennis player

Tashchy
 Borys Tashchy, Ukrainian footballer.

Places
 , a village in Kayseri Province, Turkey
 Taşçı, Gercüş, a village in Batman Province, Turkey

Turkish-language surnames